The Maracaibo Open Invitational was a golf tournament in Venezuela played from 1960 to 1974. It was part of the Caribbean Tour. The event was played at Maracaibo Country Club in Maracaibo, Venezuela. In the 1970s the event was sponsored by Ford.

Winners

References 

Golf tournaments in Venezuela